This is a list of notable actors and actresses from France.

(Persons are listed alphabetically according to their surname.)

A

 Kev Adams
 Isabelle Adjani
 Fatima Adoum
 Renée Adorée
 Anouk Aimée
 Madame Albert
 Catherine Allégret
 Béatrice Altariba
 Mathieu Amalric
 Aurélie Amblard
 Annabella
 André Antoine
 Fanny Ardant
 Mhamed Arezki
 Arletty
 Françoise Arnoul
 Henri Attal
 Yvan Attal
 Jeanne Aubert
 Cécile Aubry
 Michel Auclair
 Stéphane Audran
 Claudine Auger
 Jean-Pierre Aumont
 Michel Aumont 
 Daniel Auteuil
 Serge Avedikian

B

 Édouard Baer
 Germaine Bailac
 Josiane Balasko
 Nicolas Anselme Baptiste
 Brigitte Bardot
 Olivier Baroux
 Jean-Louis Barrault
 Marie-Christine Barrault
 Gérard Barray
 Jeanne Julia Bartet
 Harry Baur
 Nathalie Baye
 Emmanuelle Béart
 Ramzy Bedia
 Loleh Bellon
 Frédérique Bel
 Annie Belle
 Yasmine Belmadi
 Jean-Paul Belmondo
 Jeanne Bérangère
 Sarah Bernhardt
 Claude Berri
 Adam Bessa
 Suzanne Bianchetti
 Juliette Binoche
 René Blancard
 Dominique Blanchar
 Pierre Blanchar
 Françoise Blanchard
 Bernard Blier
 Richard Bohringer
 Dany Boon
 Elodie Bouchez
 Pierre Boulanger
 Carole Bouquet
 Michel Bouquet
 Bourvil
 Jean-Pierre Bouyxou
 Angelique Boyer
 Charles Boyer
 Claude Brasseur
 Pierre Brasseur
 Jean Baptiste Prosper Bressant
 Jean-Claude Brialy
 Pierre Brice
 Liina Brunelle

C

 Guillaume Canet
 Capucine
 Jean Carmet
 Martine Carol
 Leslie Caron
 Jean-Pierre Cassel
 Vincent Cassel
 Laetitia Casta
 Catherine Castel
 Marie-Pierre Castel
 Marie-Louise Cébron-Norbens
 Daniel Ceccaldi
 Alain Chabat
 Timothée Chalamet
 Marie Champmeslé
 Alexandre Charlet
 Maurice Chevalier
 Charles Chevillet
 Christian Clavier
 Aurore Clément
 Corinne Cléry
 François Cluzet
 Alice Cocéa
 Coluche
 Benoît-Constant Coquelin
 Ernest Alexandre Honoré Coquelin
 Stéphane Cornicard
 Clovis Cornillac
 Marion Cotillard
 Clotilde Courau
 Darry Cowl
 Bruno Cremer
 René Cresté
 Valérie Crunchant

D

 Béatrice Dalle
 Marie-Louise Damien
 Lili Damita
 Mireille Darc
 Colette Darfeuil
 Mireille Dargent
 Hélène Darly 
 Gérard Darmon
 Danielle Darrieux
 Claude Dauphin
 Josette Day
 Jamel Debbouze
 Virginie Déjazet
 Rose Delaunay
 Raf De La Torre
 Suzy Delair
 Danièle Delorme
 Alain Delon
 Julie Delpy
 Irina Demick
 Catherine Deneuve
 Lily-Rose Melody Depp
 Gérard Depardieu
 Guillaume Depardieu
 Jean Desailly
 Patrick Dewaere
 Vernon Dobtcheff
 Françoise Dorléac
 Mélanie Doutey
 Julie Dreyfus
 Juliette Drouet
 Yvonne Dubel
 Joséphine Duchesnois
 Jean Dujardin
 Albert Dupontel
 Jacques Dutronc
 Nicolas Duvauchelle

E

 Mehdi El Glaoui
 Jérémie Elkaïm
 Gad Elmaleh

F

 Saturnin Fabre
 Renée Faure
 Charles Nicolas Favart
 Frédéric Febvre
 Fernandel
 Edwige Feuillère
 Grégory Fitoussi
 Marina Fois
 Sara Forestier
 Brigitte Fossey
 Victor Francen
 Pierre Fresnay
 Catherine Frot
 Louis de Funès

G

 Jean Gabin
 Gabriel Gabrio
 Charlotte Gainsbourg
 Serge Gainsbourg
 Michel Galabru
 Jacques Gamblin
 Henri Garat
 Nicole Garcia
 Daniel Gélin
 Marin Gerrier
 Annie Girardot
 Bernard Giraudeau
 Judith Godrèche
 François Jules Edmond Got
 Fernand Gravey
 Juliette Gréco
 Eva Green
 Louise Grinberg
 Olivier Gruner
 Georges Guibourg
 Lucien Germain Guitry
 Sacha Guitry
 Paul Gury

H

 Jane Hading
 Adèle Haenel
 Johnny Hallyday
 Françoise Hardy
 Serge Hazanavicius
 Catherine Hessling
 Isabelle Huppert

I
 Eva Ionesco (born 1965)

J

 Catherine Jacob
 Irène Jacob
 Claude Jade
 Marlène Jobert
 Philippe Joly
 Louis Jourdan
 Louis Jouvet
 Odette Joyeux
 Eric Judor
 Gérard Jugnot
 Sandra Julien

K

 Valérie Kaprisky
 Valérie Karsenti
 Tchéky Karyo
 Mathieu Kassovitz
 Salim Kechiouche
 Véra Korène

L

 Louise Labèque
 Dominique Laffin
 Christopher Lambert
 Robert Lamoureux
 Gérard Lanvin
 Michèle Laroque
 Elise Larnicol
 Gérald Laroche
 Pierre Larquey
 Chantal Lauby
 Mélanie Laurent
 Samuel Le Bihan
 Jean-Pierre Léaud
 Ginette Leclerc
 Jacques Lecoq
 Adrienne Lecouvreur
 Virginie Ledoyen
 Jean Lefebvre
 Valérie Lemercier
 Adélaïde Leroux
 Côme Levin
 Thierry Lhermitte
 Max Linder
 Vincent Lindon
 Michael Lonsdale
 Sylvia Lopez
 Fabrice Luchini
 Lugné-Poe

M

 Benoît Magimel
 Jean Marais
 André Maranne
 Marcel Marceau
 Sophie Marceau
 Georges Marchal
 Guy Marchand
 Janie Marèse
 Jean-Pierre Marielle
 Frédéric Mariotti 
 Pierre-François Martin-Laval
 Olivier Martinez
 Nicolas Maury
 Mathilda May
 Andrée Mégard
 Étienne Mélingue
 Daniel Mendaille
 Kad Merad
 Claude Mérelle
 Roxane Mesquida
 Paul Meurisse
 Patrick Mille [fr]
 Bernard Minet
 Pierre Mondy
 Yves Montand
 Jeanne Moreau
 Michèle Morgan
 Gaby Morlay
 Jean Mounet-Sully
 Musidora
 Francine Mussey

N

 Samy Naceri
 Magali Noël
 Noël-Noël
 Philippe Noiret
 Paulette Noizeux
 France Nuyen

O

 Bulle Ogier
 Pascale Ogier
 Madeleine Ozeray

P

 Hervé Paillet
 Pierre Palmade
 Vanessa Paradis
 Rod Paradot
 Anne Parillaud
 Marie-Georges Pascal
 Raymond Pellegrin
 François Périer
 Léonce Perret
 Nathalie Perrey
 Francis Perrin
 Jacques Perrin
 Jean Peyrière
 Gérard Philipe
 Michel Piccoli
 Roger Pierre
 Dominique Pinon
 Marie-France Pisier
 Elvire Popesco
 Georges Poujouly
 Perrette Pradier
 Albert Préjean
 Micheline Presle
 Yvonne Printemps
 Wojciech Pszoniak
 Bruno Putzulu

R

 Pierre-Loup Rajot 
 Blanche Ravalec
 Camille Razat
 Serge Reggiani
 Gabrielle Réjane
 Simone Renant
 Madeleine Renaud
 Jean Reno
 Pierre Renoir
 Hortense Rhéa
 Claude Rich
 Jean Richard
 Pierre Richard
 Pierre Richard-Willm
 Stéphane Rideau
 Emmanuelle Riva
 Dany Robin
 Gabrielle Robinne
 Jean Rochefort
 Sebastian Roché
 Sonia Rolland
 Viviane Romance
 Béatrice Romand
 Maurice Ronet
 Raymond Rouleau
 Jean-Paul Rouve
 Benoît Régent
 Gabrielle Réjane
 Noël Roquevert

S

 Ludivine Sagnier
 Renée Saint-Cyr
 Xavier Saint-Macary
 Maria Schneider
 Romy Schneider
 Emmanuelle Seigner
 Mathilde Seigner
 Michel Serrault
 Jean Servais
 Léa Seydoux
 Delphine Seyrig
 Clément Sibony
 Simone Signoret
 Michel Simon
 Simone Simon
 Sam Spiegel
 Omar Sy

T

 Jacques Tati
 Audrey Tautou
 Sylvie Testud
 Zelia Trebelli-Bettini
 Jean-Louis Trintignant
 Marie Trintignant
 François Truffaut

U
 Gaspard Ulliel

V

 Christian Vadim
 Charles Vanel
 Michael Vartan
 Paul Vermoyal 
 Henri Vidal
 Hervé Villechaize
 Jacques Villeret
 Pascal Vincent
 Marthe Vinot
 Maurice Vinot
 Marina Vlady

W

Catherine Wilkening
 Lambert Wilson

Y

 Hichem Yacoubi
 Jean Yanne
 Jean d'Yd
 Jean Yonnel
 Wladimir Yordanoff 
 Michaël Youn
 Elodie Yung

Z

 Jacques Zabor
 Dominique Zardi
 Roschdy Zem
 Malik Zidi
 Pierre Zimmer

See also

:Category:Film by year
List of years in film
List of French people
List of German actors

References

 
France
Actors